The 2018 Volta a Catalunya was a road cycling stage race that took place between 19 and 25 March 2018 in Spain. It was the 98th edition of the Volta a Catalunya and the ninth event of the 2018 UCI World Tour.

For the second year in a row, and for the third time in his career, the race was won by  rider Alejandro Valverde. Valverde won the second and fourth stages during the race, taking the race lead – and the mountains jersey as well – for good after his second stage victory. He finished 29 seconds clear of his nearest rival, team-mate Nairo Quintana, after Quintana's Colombian compatriot Egan Bernal crashed out of the race on the final day. The podium was completed by 's Pierre Latour, a further 18 seconds in arrears of Quintana; Bernal's withdrawal also allowed Latour to claim the young rider classification. The other jersey on offer for the sprints classification was claimed by Lluís Mas, while the  won the teams classification, after placing a third rider – Marc Soler – in the top-five overall.

Before the start of the last stage, the women's reVolta was organised for the first time.

Teams
As the Volta a Catalunya was a UCI World Tour event, all eighteen UCI WorldTeams were invited automatically and obliged to enter a team in the race. Seven UCI Professional Continental teams competed, completing the 25-team peloton.

Route
The full route of the 2018 Volta a Catalunya was announced on 12 March 2018.

Stages

Stage 1
19 March 2018 — Calella to Calella,

Stage 2
20 March 2018 — Mataró to Valls,

Stage 3
21 March 2018 — Sant Cugat del Vallès to Camprodon,

Stage 4
22 March 2018 — Llanars to La Molina,

Stage 5
23 March 2018 — Llívia to Vielha–Val d'Aran,

Stage 6
24 March 2018 — La Pobla de Segur to Torrefarrera,

Stage 7
25 March 2018 — Barcelona to Barcelona,

Classification leadership table
In the 2018 Volta a Catalunya, four different jerseys were awarded. The general classification was calculated by adding each cyclist's finishing times on each stage. Time bonuses were awarded to the first three finishers on all stages: the stage winner won a ten-second bonus, with six and four seconds for the second and third riders respectively. Bonus seconds were also awarded to the first three riders at intermediate sprints; three seconds for the winner of the sprint, two seconds for the rider in second and one second for the rider in third. The leader of the general classification received a white and green jersey. This classification was considered the most important of the 2018 Volta a Catalunya, and the winner of the classification was considered the winner of the race.

The second classification was the sprints classification, the leader of which was awarded a white and orange jersey. In the sprints classification, riders received points for finishing in the top three at intermediate sprint points during each stage. There was also a mountains classification, the leadership of which was marked by a white and red jersey. Points for this classification were won by the first riders to the top of each categorised climb, with more points available for the higher-categorised climbs. Double points were also scheduled to be awarded at the summit finishes at Vallter 2000–Setcases (special-category) and La Molina (first-category), however the Vallter 2000–Setcases finish was removed due to the threat of poor weather.

The fourth jersey represented the young rider classification, marked by a white and blue jersey. Only riders born after 1 January 1993 were eligible; the young rider best placed in the general classification was the leader of the young rider classification. There was also a classification for teams, in which the times of the best three cyclists per team on each stage were added together; the leading team at the end of the race was the team with the lowest total time.

Notes

References

Sources

External links

2018
2018 UCI World Tour
2018 in Spanish road cycling
2018 in Catalan sport
March 2018 sports events in Spain